In Greek mythology, Hesperia (Ancient Greek: Ἑσπερια) or Hesperie, may refer to the following characters and places:

Hesperia, one of the Hesperides; in some versions, the daughter of Hesperus.
 Hesperia, also called Asterope, the wife or desired lover of Aesacus and daughter of the river Cebren
 Hesperia as "western land" is the ancient Greek name of Italy, also used in Latin epic poetry, in gender either a feminine noun or a neuter plural adjective used substantively, spelt the same but with different definite articles, and with the accent shifted from the penult to the antepenult. This becomes Latin Hesperia  or Hesperius, the latter not a distinct nominal form, but simply an adjective used substantively,  viz. Vergil's Aeneid VI, 6
 Hesperia, the Iberian Peninsula and Northwest Africa, further to the west, used in both Ancient Greek and Byzantine sources

Classic Literature Sources 
Chronological listing of classical literature sources for Hesperia:

 Horace, Carminum 1. 36. 1 ff (trans. Bennett) (Roman lyric poetry C1st BC)
 Virgil, The Aeneid 1. 530 ff (trans. Hamilton Bryce) (Roman poetry C1st BC)
 Scholiast on Virgil, The Aeneid 1. 530 (The Works of Virgil trans. Hamilton Bryce 1894 p. 172)
 Virgil, The Aeneid 1. 569 ff (trans. Hamilton Bryce)
 Virgil, Aeneid 2. 780 ff (trans. Fairclough)
 Virgil, The Aeneid 3. 163 ff (trans. Hamilton Bryce)
 Virgil, The Aeneid 3. 185 ff
 Virgil, Aeneid 3. 503 ff (trans. Fairclough)
 Scholiast on Virgil, Aeneid 3. 503 (Virgil trans. Fairclough 1938 Vol 1 p. 589)
 Virgil, The Aeneid 4. 272 ff (trans. Hamilton Bryce)
 Virgil, Aeneid 7. 1 ff (trans. Fairclough)
 Virgil, Aeneid 7. 41 ff
 Virgil, Aeneid 7. 540 ff
 Virgil, The Aeneid 8. 148 ff (trans. Hamilton Bryce)
 Virgil, Aeneid 12. 360 ff (trans. Fairclough)
 Propertius, Elegies, 4. 1a. 86 ff (trans. Butler) (Latin poetry C1st BC)
 Ovid, Metamorphoses 11. 760-795 (end) (trans. Miller) (Roman epic poetry C1st BC to C1st AD)
 Seneca, Medea 725 ff (trans. Miller) (Roman tragedy C1st AD
 Seneca, Hippolytus 568 ff (trans. Miller) (Roman tragedy C1st AD
 Statius, Thebaid 10. 1 (trans. Mozley) (Roman epic poetry C1st AD)
 Petronius, Satyricon 154 ff (trans. Heseltine) (Roman satire C1st AD)
 Silius, Punica 4. 815 ff (trans. Duff) (Roman epic poetry C1st AD)
 Silius, Punica 17. 219 ff
 Lucan, Pharsalia 1. 29 (trans. Riley) (Roman poetry C1st AD)
 Lucan, Pharsalia 1. 224
 Lucan, Pharsalia 1. 404
 Scholiast on Lucan, Pharsalia 1. 404 (The Pharsalia of Lucan trans. Riley 1853 p. 24)
 Lucan, Pharsalia 1. 505
 Scholiast on Lucan, Pharsalia 1. 505 (The Pharsalia of Lucan trans. Riley 1853 p. 35)
 Lucan, Pharsalia 2. 293
 Lucan, Pharsalia 2. 410
 Lucan, Pharsalia 2. 433
 Lucan, Pharsalia 2. 441
 Lucan, Pharsalia 2. 534
 Lucan, Pharsalia 2. 608
 Lucan, Pharsalia 2. 614
 Lucan, Pharsalia 2. 734
 Lucan, Pharsalia 3. 66
 Lucan, Pharsalia 5. 38
 Lucan, Pharsalia 5. 266
 Lucan, Pharsalia 5. 329
 Lucan, Pharsalia 5. 534
 Lucan, Pharsalia 5. 691
 Lucan, Pharsalia 5. 703
 Lucan, Pharsalia 6. 322
 Lucan, Pharsalia 7. 403
 Lucan, Pharsalia 7. 871
 Scholiast on Lucan, Pharsalia 7. 871 (The Pharsalia of Lucan trans. Riley 1853 p. 292)
 Lucan, Pharsalia 8. 189
 Lucan, Pharsalia 8. 285
 Lucan, Pharsalia 8. 351
 Lucan, Pharsalia 8. 768
 Lucan, Pharsalia 8. 826
 Lucan, Pharsalia 10. 62
 Scholiast on Lucan, Pharsalia 10. 62 (The Pharsalia of Lucan trans. Riley 1853 p. 387)
 Lucan, Pharsalia 10. 450
 Pseudo-Apollodorus, The Library 2. 5. 11 ff (trans. Frazer) (Greek mythography C2nd AD)
 Servius, Servii Grammatici In Vergilii Aeneidos 1. 530 (trans. Thilo & Hagen) (Greek commentary C4th AD to 5th AD)
 Servius, Servii Grammatici In Vergilii Aeneidos 2. 780
 Servius, Servii Grammatici In Vergilii Aeneidos 3. 501. 15 ff
 Servius, Servii Grammatici In Vergilii Aeneidos 4. 36
 Servius, Servii Grammatici In Vergilii Aeneidos 7. 3
 Servius, Servii Grammatici In Vergilii Aeneidos 8. 328

See also

Notes

References 

 Apollodorus, The Library with an English Translation by Sir James George Frazer, F.B.A., F.R.S. in 2 Volumes, Cambridge, MA, Harvard University Press; London, William Heinemann Ltd. 1921. ISBN 0-674-99135-4. Online version at the Perseus Digital Library. Greek text available from the same website.
 Publius Ovidius Naso, Metamorphoses translated by Brookes More (1859-1942). Boston, Cornhill Publishing Co. 1922. Online version at the Perseus Digital Library.
 Publius Ovidius Naso, Metamorphoses. Hugo Magnus. Gotha (Germany). Friedr. Andr. Perthes. 1892. Latin text available at the Perseus Digital Library.

Children of Potamoi
Women in Greek mythology
Classical antiquity
 
History of geography